The following is a list of the 385 communes of the Orne department of France.

The communes cooperate in the following intercommunalities (as of 2020):
Communauté urbaine d'Alençon (partly)
Communauté d'agglomération Flers Agglo
Communauté de communes Andaine-Passais
CC Argentan Intercom
Communauté de communes Cœur du Perche
Communauté de communes des Collines du Perche Normand
CC Domfront Tinchebray Interco
Communauté de communes des Hauts du Perche
Communauté de communes Maine Saosnois (partly)
Communauté de communes des Pays de L'Aigle
Communauté de communes du Pays fertois et du Bocage carrougien
Communauté de communes du Pays de Mortagne au Perche
Communauté de communes des Sources de l'Orne
Communauté de communes du Val d'Orne
Communauté de communes de la Vallée de la Haute Sarthe
Communauté de communes des Vallées d'Auge et du Merlerault

| width=47% valign=top|

| width=52% valign=top|

References

Orne